Beach Volley is a beach volleyball video game developed by Ocean France for the Amiga, Atari ST, Amstrad CPC, Commodore 64, and ZX Spectrum, released by Ocean Software in 1989. A stranger interrupts a beach volleyball game and offering the player to join the "Ocean Beach Volley" worldwide tournament, to play against the best from eight other countries. The winner of this competition will receive $250,000 dollars.

Beach Volley is the first Ocean France product and one of the first Ocean games to be aimed for the Amiga and Atari ST.

Gameplay

Follows the base ruleset of beach volleyball. Two teams of two players each trying to score by making the ball land inside the opponents half of the court. First team reaching seven points within six minutes wins and head to another of the eight countries. At five minutes of play, the music changes to a different tune to indicate the player to hurry up. If the player reach the six minutes limit, the player lose the game, even if the player are ahead in points. One or two player at once can play the game, but tournament mode is only available for single player. In singe player mode the player will be joined by an AI controlled player. To help the human player a flickering blue cursor on the ground will indicate where the ball will be landing.

The world tournament consists of a single match in eight different countries, which is seen on a world map. The team starts in London and the final match will be held in Paris. The team had to take challenges in New York City, Nassau, Luxor, Sydney, Tokyo and Moscow in between too. Every hosting country will be introduced with a little humorous skit, which is usually related to their sights or locations.

Reception
Reviews from 1989

Reviews from 1991

References

External links
 Beach Volley at Lemon Amiga
 Longplay video

1989 video games
Amiga games
Commodore 64 games
Atari ST games
Amstrad CPC games
Video games developed in France
Video games scored by Jean Baudlot
ZX Spectrum games
Ocean Software games
Beach volleyball video games
Multiplayer and single-player video games